The Eighty Club was a  political London gentlemen's club named after the year it was founded, 1880 (much like the later 1900 Club and 1920 Club). It was strictly aligned to the  Liberal Party, with members having to pledge support to join. Somewhat dwarfed by  mass-membership clubs like the National Liberal Club, it could only claim 400 members in 1890, and 600 by 1900.

H. H. Asquith was the first secretary of the Eighty Club and David Lloyd George was sometime President.

The Club finally closed in  1978, although the name was then adopted as the title of the Association of Liberal Democrat Lawyers' annual lecture series.

Notes

See also

List of London's gentlemen's clubs

Gentlemen's clubs in London
1880 establishments in the United Kingdom
1978 disestablishments in the United Kingdom
Liberal Party (UK)